Crossword Quiz was a Canadian game show which aired on CBC Television December 26, 1952 to June 30, 1953. Gameshow moderator Kim McIlroy provided crossword puzzle-style clues to James Bannerman, Ralph Allen, editor of Maclean's magazine, and two guest panelists. Morley Callaghan replaced McIlroy as moderator on March 20, 1953.

External links 

 Queen's University Directory of CBC Television Series (Crossword Quiz archived listing link via archive.org)
 
 Crossword Quiz - All Level Answers

1952 Canadian television series debuts
1953 Canadian television series endings
CBC Television original programming
1950s Canadian game shows
Black-and-white Canadian television shows
Crossword television shows